The 2017–18 ISU Junior Grand Prix is the 21st season of a series of junior international competitions organized by the International Skating Union. It is the junior-level complement to the 2017–18 ISU Grand Prix of Figure Skating. Skaters competed for medals in the disciplines of men's singles, ladies' singles, pair skating, and ice dance, as well as for qualifying points. The top six from each discipline met at the 2017–18 Junior Grand Prix Final, held together with the senior final.

Competitions 
The locations of the JGP events change yearly. In the 2017–18 season, the series is composed of the following events in autumn 2017:

Entries 
Skaters who reach the age of 13 by July 1, 2017 but have not turned 19 (singles and females of the other two disciplines) or 21 (male pair skaters and ice dancers) are eligible to compete on the junior circuit. Competitors are chosen by their countries according to their federation's selection procedures. The number of entries allotted to each ISU member federation is determined by their skaters' placements at the 2017 World Junior Championships in each discipline.

Medalists

Men

Ladies

Pairs

Ice dance

Overall standings

Medal standings

Standings per nation 
Starting in the 2015–16 season, the ISU added standings per nation. Points are calculated for each discipline separately before being combined for a total score per nation. For each discipline, each nation combines the points from up to four JGP events. A country does not have to use the same events for each discipline (e.g. a country can combine points from JGP events in France, Japan, Russia, and Slovenia for pairs while using Czech Republic, Japan, Estonia, and Germany for ice dance). For each discipline at each event, each nation combines the points from up to two skaters/couples. The points each skater/couple earns is based on placement. Placement to point conversion is the same as for qualification, with first place earning 15 points, second earning 13 points, etc. In the event ties in the total scores, the country with the fewer skaters/couples (only counting skaters/couples from whom points were combined), wins the tie breaker. If the tie is not broken, the nations will have the same rank.

The current standings are:

JGP Final qualification standings

Qualification rules 
At each event, skaters earn points toward qualification for the Junior Grand Prix Final. Following the 7th event, the top six highest scoring skaters advance to the Final. The points earned per placement are as follows:

There are seven tie-breakers in cases of a tie in overall points:
	Highest placement at an event. If a skater placed 1st and 3rd, the tiebreaker is the 1st place, and that beats a skater who placed 2nd in both events.
	Highest combined total scores in both events. If a skater earned 200 points at one event and 250 at a second, that skater would win in the second tie-break over a skater who earned 200 points at one event and 150 at another.
	Participated in two events.
	Highest combined scores in the free skating/free dance portion of both events.
	Highest individual score in the free skating/free dance portion from one event.
	Highest combined scores in the short program/short dance of both events.
	Highest number of total participants at the events.

If there is still a tie, it is considered unbreakable and the tied skaters all advance to the Junior Grand Prix Final.

Qualifiers

Top JGP scores

Men

Total score

Short program

Free skating

Ladies

Total score

Short program

Free skating

Pairs

Total score

Short program

Free skating

Ice dance

Total score

Short dance

Free dance

References

Citations

External links 
 ISU Junior Grand Prix at the International Skating Union

ISU Junior Grand Prix
Junior Grand Prix
2017 in youth sport